Brendon Martin Batson, OBE (born 6 February 1953) is an English former footballer who played as a defender for Arsenal, Cambridge United and West Bromwich Albion.

Club career
Born in St. George's, Grenada, Batson moved with his family to Trinidad at the age of 6 and then migrated from the West Indies to England when he was nine years old in 1962. Until then he had never even seen a game of football and a teacher at his school, on watching his early efforts and reflecting on his birthplace opined, "Well, perhaps cricket is your game." However, he was signed as a schoolboy by Arsenal, and whilst at the club's academy won the FA Youth Cup of 1971. Batson signed as a professional at 17 years old at the club and eventually went on to feature for the Gunners' first team, becoming the first black player to do so. In all, he made 10 appearances for Arsenal before moving to Cambridge United in 1974. He spent four years at Cambridge, captaining the side to the Fourth Division Championship under manager Ron Atkinson in 1976–77. At Cambridge Batson made a total of 163 appearances and scored six goals altogether.

When Atkinson moved to West Bromwich Albion in 1978, he successfully encouraged Batson to follow him and team up with fellow black players Cyrille Regis and Laurie Cunningham, leaving in a deal worth £28,000. Although not by any means the first black footballers to play professionally in England, the players nicknamed Three Degrees by Atkinson, a reference to contemporary vocal trio of the same name, were pioneering, iconic and extremely popular with West Brom's fans. This trio's fame is to such an extent that in 2012 plans were put forward for a statue of which would honor the footballing trio being purposely displayed in October 2014 at The Hawthorns. The completed statue was publicly unveiled in New Square in the town on 21 May 2019.

Whilst a West Bromwich Albion player he featured in a benefit match for Len Cantello, that saw a team of white players play against a team of black players. He played 160 games for the Baggies before his career was cut short in 1982 by a serious knee injury.

International career
Batson was capped three times for the England B team against the United States, Spain and Australia.

Administrative career
Following the end to his playing days, Batson was thereafter appointed as the deputy chief executive of the Professional Footballers' Association in 1984. He then spent a total of 18 years in this position and remains as a trustee of the association. He later rejoined West Brom within the role of a managing director at the club, helping to form the West Bromwich Albion Former Players' Association in 2003. Batson in 2007, joined the body then known as the Football Licensing Agency (FLA) that's now entitled as the Sports Grounds Safety Authority. He is the longest serving member of the board of the authority.

Batson was appointed Member of the Order of the British Empire (MBE) in the 2001 New Year Honours
and Officer of the Order of the British Empire (OBE) in the 2015 New Year Honours, both for services to football.

Personal life
Batson was married to Cecily, who died in September 2009.

Honours
Arsenal Youth
FA Youth Cup: 1970–71

Cambridge United
Fourth Division: 1976–77

Individual
PFA Team of the Year: 1976–77 Fourth Division
PFA Team of the Year: 1977–78 Third Division

References

Bibliography
Bowler, D., & J. Bains (2000), Samba in the Smethwick End: Regis, Cunningham, Batson and the Football Revolution, 
Paul Rees,(2014) "The Three Degrees The Men Who Changed British Football Forever" 

1953 births
Living people
English footballers
Association football fullbacks
Arsenal F.C. players
Cambridge United F.C. players
West Bromwich Albion F.C. players
Officers of the Order of the British Empire
England B international footballers
Grenadian emigrants to England
Black British sportspeople
People from St. George's, Grenada
English Football League players